"New Millenium (What Cha Wanna Do)" is a song written and performed by American rapper Parris "Cha Cha" Fluellen. It was released on June 1, 1999 via Noontime/Epic Records as the lead single from her debut studio album Dear Diary. Recording sessions took place at Triangle Sound Studios in Atlanta. Production was handled by Kevin "She'kspere" Briggs. The remix version features American rapper and producer Jermaine Dupri.

An accompanying music video was directed by Rubin Whitmore II and released to promote the song. It was added on the New Ons on The Box and gained a lot of exposure and spins. The single peaked at number 20 in Germany, at number 68 in Switzerland, and reached number 28 on the Billboard Hot Rap Songs chart in the United States.

Track listing

Personnel
Parris "Cha Cha" Fluellen – lyrics, vocals, vocal arrangement
Kevin "She'kspere" Briggs – all instruments, producer, recording
Alvin Speights – mixing
Claudine Pontier – assistant mixing
Vernon Mungo – assistant mixing

Charts

References

External links

1999 songs
American hip hop songs
1999 debut singles
Epic Records singles
American contemporary R&B songs
Songs written by Kevin "She'kspere" Briggs